The Mayor of Macon-Bibb County is the highest elected official in the consolidated city-county government of Macon and Bibb County, Georgia. The county was established in 1822, while the city was incorporated in 1823. Heads of the city were known as "intendents" prior to 1833. The city and county governments were consolidated in 2014.

List of officeholders

Intendents of the City of Macon 
 David S. Booth (1824)
 James H. Rogers (1825)
 Edward Dorr Tracy (1826)
 Washington Poe (1827)
 Robert Birdsong (1828)
 Joseph Washburn (1829)
 W. J. Dannelly (1830)
 Isaac R. Rowland (1831)
 Levi Eckley (1832)

Mayors of the City of Macon
 Isaac G. Seymour (1833–1834) elected by Board of Aldermen
 Robert Augustus Beall (1835) 1st popularly elected
 Isaac G. Seymour (1836–1839)
 Washington Poe (1840–1841)
 Frederick Sims (1842)
 John J. Gresham (1843)
 James A. Nisbet (1844–1845)
 Isaac Holmes (1846)
 John J. Gresham (1847)
 George M. Logan (1848–1850)
 James H. R. Washington (1851)
 E. L. Strohecker (1852–1854)
 Benjamin Franklin Ross (1855–1856)
 A. B. Adams (1857)
 Ovid G. Sparks (1858–1860) resigned September 18, 1860
 Methvin S. Thompson (1860–1862) elected September 25, 1860
 Ovid G. Sparks (1863)
 Stephen Collins (1864–1866)
 George S. Obear (1867–1870)
 William A. Huff (1871–1879)
 Felix Corput (1880–1883)
 Sylvester B. Price (1884–1894)
 Henry Horne (1895–1896)
 Sylvester B. Price (1897)
 Bridges Smith (1898–1907)
 Alexander Lawton Miller (1908–1909)
 John T. Moore (mayor) (1910–1913)
 Bridges Smith (1914–1917)
 Glover Glendenning Toole (1918–1921)
 Luther Williams (1922–1925)
 Wallace Miller (1926–1927)
 Luther Williams (1928–1929)
 Glover Glendenning Toole (1930–1933)
 Herbert Ivan Smart (1933–1937)
 Charles L. Bowden (1937–1947)
 Lewis Burgess Wilson (1947–1953)
 Benjamin Franklin Merritt, Jr. (1953–1959)
 Edgar H. Wilson (1959–1963)
 Benjamin Franklin Merritt, Jr. (1963–1967)
 Ronnie Thompson (1967–1975) 1st elected Republican mayor
 Buck Melton (1975–1979)
 George Israel (1979 – December 14, 1987) 2nd elected Republican mayor
 Lee Robinson (December 14, 1987 – December 11, 1991)
 Tommy Olmstead (December 11, 1991 – 1995)
 David Carter (1995)
 Jim Marshall (1995 – December 14, 1999)
 C. Jack Ellis (December 14, 1999 – December 12, 2007) 1st African American mayor
 Robert Reichert (December 12, 2007 - December 31, 2013)

Mayors of Macon-Bibb County 
Robert Reichert (January 1, 2014 - December 30, 2020)
Lester Miller (since January 1, 2021)

See also
 Timeline of Macon, Georgia

References

External links
 Macon Mayor's office

Macon, Georgia